Chiseldon railway station was on the Midland and South Western Junction Railway in Wiltshire.

History 
The station opened on 27 July 1881 on the Swindon Town to Marlborough section of the Swindon, Marlborough and Andover Railway. In 1883, a northwards extension, the Swindon and Cheltenham Extension Railway, opened from Swindon Town to Cirencester, with further northward extension to a junction with the Great Western Railway's Cheltenham to Banbury at Andoversford opening in 1891, enabling through trains from the Midlands to the south, through Chiseldon. The SM&AR and the S&CER had in 1884 amalgamated to form the M&SWJR.

Chiseldon was sited on a curved section of track in the middle of the village of Chiseldon, and was for many years busy with both goods traffic, primarily agricultural, and passengers. In the First World War a long siding was built to a nearby army camp, then called Draycott (though the nearest village to it is now spelt as Draycot Foliat), and in the Second World War too the area was the site of considerable military activity, though by then a small halt, Chiseldon Camp Halt, had been built on the line about a mile south of Chiseldon station to serve the military.

As a whole, traffic on the M&SWJR fell steeply after the Second World War and the line closed to passengers in 1961, with goods facilities withdrawn from this section of the line at the same time. No trace of the station now remains.

Route

References

Disused railway stations in Wiltshire
Former Midland and South Western Junction Railway stations
Railway stations in Great Britain opened in 1881
Railway stations in Great Britain closed in 1961
1881 establishments in England